The 2016–17 East Carolina Pirates women's basketball team represented East Carolina University during the 2016–17 NCAA Division I women's basketball season. The Pirates, led by seventh year head coach Heather Macy, played their home games at Williams Arena at Minges Coliseum and were third year members of the American Athletic Conference. They finished the season 11–19, 2–14 AAC play to finish in last place. They lost in the first round of the American Athletic women's tournament to SMU.

Media
All Pirates home games will have a video stream on Pirates All Access, ESPN3, or AAC Digital. Road games will typically be streamed on the opponents website, though conference road games could also appear on ESPN3 or AAC Digital. Audio broadcasts for most road games can also be found on the opponents website.

Roster

Schedule and results

|-
!colspan=9 style="background:#4F0076; color:#FFE600;"| Non-conference regular season

|-
!colspan=9 style="background:#4F0076; color:#FFE600;"| AAC regular season

|-
!colspan=12 style="background:#4B1869;"| American Athletic Conference Women's Tournament

Rankings
2016–17 NCAA Division I women's basketball rankings

See also
2016–17 East Carolina Pirates men's basketball team

References

East Carolina
East Carolina Pirates women's basketball seasons